or  may refer to:

 Rollkugel (trackball device), a Telefunken computer trackball device developed in the mid 1960s
 Rollkugel (mouse device), a Telefunken computer ball mouse developed in 1968

See also 

 Ball mouse
 Rolling ball
 Ball